Katpadi Junction railway station, also known as Vellore Katpadi Junction railway station (station code: KPD) is an A-category junction railway station located in the city of Vellore, Tamil Nadu.

Katpadi Junction is the primary terminus and junction of Fort City Vellore. Katpadi is the eighth highest revenue earning railway station in the Southern railway.

Platforms 1 and 2 are primarily used for trains running between Chennai and Bangalore/Trivandrum while platforms 3, 4, and 5 are used for trains running towards Tirupati and Vellore Cantt.

Trains
Nearly 259 trains halt at this junction. Katpadi junction is the railway station in Tamil Nadu, where highest number of trains stop. Major commuters to Katpadi station are people who travel to Vellore Golden Temple, CMC Hospital and VIT University. On an average it serves approximately 18,000 passengers daily, with 11 originating trains and 67 passing. Three Shatabdi Expresses (Chennai–Coimbatore, Chennai–Bangalore and Chennai–Mysore), one Vande Bharat Express(Chennai-Mysuru), and one Double Decker Express (Chennai–Bangalore) have halts here.

See also
 Vellore Cantonment
 Vellore
 List of areas of Vellore
 Vellore (Lok Sabha constituency)

References

Railway junction stations in Tamil Nadu
Railway stations in Vellore district
Transport in Vellore
Chennai railway division